The Papua snake lizard (Lialis jicari), also known commonly as Jicar's snake-lizard, the New Guinea snake-lizard, and the Papua snake-lizard, is a species of legless lizard in the family Pygopodidae. The species is endemic to New Guinea including the Bismarck Archipelago.

Etymology
The specific name, jicari, is in honor of Mr. A.H. Jiear, a Resident Magistrate in British New Guinea, who presented the holotype to the British Museum (Natural History). Boulenger misread the donor's surname as "Jicar".

Habitat

Description
L. jicari is limbless. It has 22 scales around the middle of the body, seven preanal pores, and six anal scales.

Reproduction
L. jicari is oviparous.

References

Further reading
Boulenger GA (1903). "Descriptions of new Lizards in the Collection of British Museum". Annals and Magazine of Natural History, Seventh Series 12: 429–435. (Lialis jicari, new species, p. 430).

Lialis
Reptiles of Western New Guinea
Reptiles of Papua New Guinea
Reptiles described in 1903
Taxa named by George Albert Boulenger
Lizards of New Guinea